Janine Jagger (born  1950) is an American epidemiologist, Becton Dickinson Professor of Research of Internal Medicine and Infectious Diseases, and director of the International Health Care Worker Safety Center at the University of Virginia School of Medicine.

Life
She graduated from Moravian College with a Bachelor of Arts, cum laude, in Psychology in 1972, and from the University of Pittsburgh with a Master of Public Health in 1974, and from University of Virginia with a Ph.D. in 1987.
She has been devoted to reducing needle stick injuries.

Awards
2002 MacArthur Fellows Program

Works
Prevention and Control of Nosocomial Infections, Editor Richard P Wenzel, Lippincott Williams & Wilkins; Fourth Edition (December 15, 2002), 
Preventing occupational exposures to bloodborne pathogens: articles from advances in exposures prevention, 1994-2003, Editors Janine Jagger, Jane L. Perry, International Healthcare Worker Safety Center, University of Virginia, 2004, 
"Progress in Preventing Sharps Injuries in the United States", Handbook of Modern Hospital Safety, Second Edition, CRC Press, 2009,

References

1950 births
Living people
Moravian University alumni
University of Pittsburgh School of Public Health alumni
University of Virginia School of Medicine alumni
University of Virginia School of Medicine faculty
MacArthur Fellows
American women epidemiologists
American epidemiologists
21st-century American women